MLPC may refer to:

 Communist Party of Canada (Marxist-Leninist)
 Movement for the Liberation of the Central African People
 Market Lavington Parish Council